A Night in New Arabia is a lost 1917 four-reel silent film, directed by Thomas Mills.  It is based on the short story "A Night in New Arabia" from Strictly Business, a collection of 23 short stories by O. Henry published in 1910.  The movie critic for the Moving Picture World, Margaret I. MacDonald, says that it "...is one of the best of the O. Henry four-part features".

The picture was part of the O. Henry Stories series of films produced by Vitagraph Studios/Broadway Star Features and distributed by the General Film Company.  All based on O. Henry short stories, these pictures featured many of the same actors and included Friends in San Rosario, The Third Ingredient, The Marionettes, The Green Door, Past One at Rooney's, The Cop and the Anthem, The Gold That Glittered, The Duplicity of Hargraves, The Guilty Party, The Last Leaf and The Love Philtre of Ikey Schoenstein.

Cast
Frank Glendon as Tom McLeod
Patsy De Forest as Celia Spraggins 
Horace Vinton as Jacob Spraggins
Hattie Delaro as Henrietta
Hazlan Drouart as Annette McCorkle

References

External links
 
 A Night in New Arabia, on AFI Catalog of Feature Films: The First 100 Years 1893–1993

1917 films
American black-and-white films
American silent short films
Lost American films
1910s American films